Dork is a United Kingdom-based music publication, in print and online. The editor, Stephen Ackroyd, is the founder and former editor of DIY.

History 

Dork magazine was founded in 2016 by Stephen Ackroyd, who had previously served as editor of DIY magazine. The magazine was geared to have a more widespread music focus, with an emphasis on indie rock.

List of Dork cover stars

 July 2016: Spring King
 August 2016: Glass Animals
 September 2016: The Big Moon
 October 2016: Dream Wife and Black Honey
 November 2016: The Japanese House
 December 2016 / January 2017: The 1975
 February 2017: Sundara Karma
 March 2017: VANT
 April 2017: Blaenavon
 May 2017: Will Joseph Cook
 June 2017: Marika Hackman
 July 2017: alt-J
 August 2017: Declan McKenna
 September 2017: George Ezra
 October 2017: INHEAVEN
 November 2017: Wolf Alice
 December 2017 / January 2018: Pale Waves and King Nun
 February 2018: Shame
 March 2018: Superorganism
 April 2018: Fickle Friends
 May 2018: Courtney Barnett
 June 2018: Chvrches
 July 2018: Let's Eat Grandma
 August 2018: Pale Waves
 September 2018: Spring King
 October 2018: MØ
 November 2018: Maggie Rogers
 December 2018 / January 2019: The 1975
 February 2019: The Japanese House
 March 2019: Sigrid
 April 2019: Twenty One Pilots
 May 2019: Lewis Capaldi
 June 2019: Carly Rae Jepsen
 July 2019: Bastille
 August 2019: Sam Fender
 September 2019: Muna
 October 2019: Lauv
 November 2019: Foals
 December 2019 / January 2020: Girl In Red and Inhaler
 February 2020: Bombay Bicycle Club and The Big Moon
 March 2020: Sports Team
April 2020: Easy Life
May 2020: Sea Girls
June 2020: The 1975
July 2020: Haim
August 2020: Declan McKenna
September 2020: Cavetown, Dominic Fike, mxmtoon, Tate McRae, Wallows, Chloe Moriondo, The Driver Era, I Dont Know How But They Found Me and Arlo Parks
October 2020: Alfie Templeman 
November 2020: Shame
December 2020 / January 2021: YUNGBLUD and Baby Queen
February 2021: Pale Waves
March 2021: Zara Larsson
April 2021: Girl In Red
May 2021: Wolf Alice
June 2021: Holly Humberstone
July 2021: Inhaler
August 2021: Sports Team
September 2021: Conan Gray
October 2021: Sam Fender
November 2021: Remi Wolf
December 2021 / January 2022: Wet Leg
February 2022: Bastille
March 2022: Foals
April 2022: Fontaines D.C.
May 2022: Blossoms
June 2022: Alfie Templeman
July 2022: Beabadoobee
August 2022: Maggie Rogers
September 2022: 5 Seconds of Summer, YUNGBLUD, Pale Waves, Sports Team and Lava La Rue
October 2022: Easy Life, Fletcher, Chloe Moriondo and Louis Tomlinson

References

External links
 

2016 establishments in the United Kingdom
Monthly magazines published in the United Kingdom
Music magazines published in the United Kingdom
Internet properties established in 2016
Magazines established in 2016
Online magazines published in the United Kingdom
Online music magazines published in the United Kingdom